Yan Jianhong (Chinese: 阎健宏; 1932 – 16 January 1995) was a Chinese politician who was executed in 1995 for corruption. She had been deputy director and deputy secretary of the Guizhou Provincial Planning Commission, a former member of the Standing Committee of the Guizhou Provincial Political Consultative Conference, and former chairman of the Guizhou International Trust and Investment Corporation.

Reportedly, she refused to kneel at her execution, saying "I have not knelt since China's liberation", and was shot in the back of the head while standing.

Her husband was Liu Zhengwei, Communist Party Secretary of Guizhou Province.

References 

1932 births
1995 deaths
Chinese politicians executed for corruption
20th-century executions by China
People executed by China by firearm
Executed people from Guizhou
Politicians from Guizhou
20th-century Chinese women politicians